McClement is a surname. Notable people with the surname include:

Jay McClement (born 1983), Canadian ice hockey player
Timothy McClement (born 1951), British Royal Navy admiral

See also
McClements